The Apache Kid is a 1941 American Western film directed by George Sherman and written by Eliot Gibbons and Richard Murphy. The film stars Don "Red" Barry, Lynn Merrick, LeRoy Mason, Robert Fiske, John Elliott and Forbes Murray. The film was released on September 12, 1941, by Republic Pictures.

Plot

Cast 
Don "Red" Barry as Pete Dawson aka The Apache Kid
Lynn Merrick as Barbara Taylor
LeRoy Mason as Nick Barter
Robert Fiske as Joe Walker
John Elliott as Judge John Taylor
Forbes Murray as U.S. Road Commissioner
Monte Montague as Sheriff
Al St. John as Stage Guard Dangle
Fred Toones as Snowflake

References

External links
 

1941 films
1940s English-language films
American Western (genre) films
1941 Western (genre) films
Republic Pictures films
Films directed by George Sherman
American black-and-white films
1940s American films